Nancy Heppner (born 1971) is a former Saskatchewan Party member of the Legislative Assembly of Saskatchewan, who represented the constituency of Martensville-Warman and its predecessor Martensville from 2007 to 2020.

Early life
She was born in Swift Current, and graduated from high school in 1989.

She went on to postsecondary education at the University of British Columbia.

Political career
Heppner got involved in politics in 1995, doorknocking for her father Ben Heppner. In 2000 she became the executive assistant for Member of Parliament Carol Skelton. She then moved on as Question Period coordinator for Stephen Harper until 2005.

Nancy worked for the Honourable Bev Oda (Minister of Canadian Heritage; MP for Durham) as her Director of Communications in early 2006.

Her father died from cancer in 2006 and was the previous MLA for Martensville. Heppner won a by-election for the electoral district of Martensville with 77% of the vote on March 5, 2007 for the Saskatchewan Party.

She became the first woman in Saskatchewan history to directly succeed her father as a representative in the Legislative Assembly for the same constituency, and the second woman to follow in her father's footsteps as an MLA.

Heppner was named Environment Critic by the leader of Her Majesty's Loyal Opposition, Brad Wall on March 12, 2007.

Heppner retained her seat in the general election of November 7, 2007, capturing 73.5% of the vote.  She was sworn into the new Saskatchewan Party cabinet as Minister of the Environment on November 21, 2007.

On June 29, 2010 she was shuffled out of cabinet. Heppner served in cabinet several times again for various portfolios, and left cabinet for the final time in February 2018.

Heppner did not seek re-election in the 2020 Saskatchewan general election.

Cabinet positions

References

External links
Nancy Heppner campaign website
Nancy Heppner MLA Martensville website

1971 births
Living people
Women government ministers of Canada
Members of the Executive Council of Saskatchewan
Saskatchewan Party MLAs
University of British Columbia alumni
Women MLAs in Saskatchewan
People from Swift Current
21st-century Canadian politicians
21st-century Canadian women politicians